The Junior Eurovision Song Contest is an annual contest organized between member countries of the European Broadcasting Union for children aged between 9 and 14 (8 and 15 between 2003 and 2006, 10 and 15 between 2007 and 2015). This junior contest has been broadcast every year since its debut in 2003, and is based on the Eurovision Song Contest, one of the longest-running television programmes in the world since its debut in 1956. The contest's winner has been determined using numerous voting techniques throughout its history; centre to these have been points awarded through jury voting or public voting. The country awarded the most points is declared the winner.

, twenty contests have been held, with one winner each year. Twelve different countries have won the Junior Eurovision Song Contest. Both Croatia and Italy achieved their wins on their debut participation in the contest.  is the country with the longest history in the contest without a win, having made seventeen appearances since their debut in 2003.

Winning the Junior Eurovision Song Contest provides an opportunity for the winning artist(s) to capitalise on their success and surrounding publicity by launching or furthering their career. Some artists from Junior Eurovision have progressed later in their careers to participate in national finals for the Eurovision Song Contest or the main event proper, including Molly Sandén, Nevena Božović, the Tolmachevy Sisters, Lisa, Amy and Shelley, Stefania Liberakakis, and Destiny Chukunyere.

Unlike in the Eurovision Song Contest, until 2012, it was not tradition that the previous winning country hosts the next edition of the contest. This tradition has been applied though since 2013, with only the 2015 and 2018 editions being held in a different country than the previous winner.

Winners by year

Winners by country

Performers and songwriters with multiple wins 
The following individuals have won the Junior Eurovision Song Contest as a performer or songwriter more than once.

Winners by language 
Since the contest began in 2003, all nations competing must sing in the national language (or national languages) of the country being represented, with at least 60% of the song having to be in a national language of the country.

See also 
 List of Eurovision Song Contest winners

References 

Winners